Bandipur National Park is a national park covering  in Chamarajnagar district in the Indian state of Karnataka. It was established as a tiger reserve under Project Tiger in 1973.
It is part of the Nilgiri Biosphere Reserve since 1986.

History

Geography

As a result, the park has a variety of biomes including dry deciduous forests, moist deciduous forests and shrublands. The wide range of habitats help support a diverse range of organisms. The park is flanked by the Kabini river in the north and the Moyar in the south. The Nugu river runs through the park. The highest point in the park is on a hill called Himavad Gopalaswamy Betta, where there is a Hindu temple at the summit. Bandipur has typical tropical climate with distinct wet and dry seasons. The dry and hot period usually begins in early March and can last till the arrival of the monsoon rains in June.

Flora

Bandipur supports a wide range of timber trees including: teak (Tectona grandis), rosewood (Dalbergia latifolia), sandalwood (Santalum album V), Indian-laurel (Terminalia tomentosa), Indian kino tree (Pterocarpus marsupium), giant clumping bamboo (Dendrocalamus  strictus), clumping bamboo (Bambusa arundinacea) and Grewia tiliaefolia.

There are also several notable flowering and fruiting trees and shrubs including: kadam tree (Adina cordifolia), Indian gooseberry (Emblica officinalis), crape-myrtle (Lagerstroemia lanceolata), axlewood (Anogeissus latifolia), black myrobalan (Terminalia chebula), Schleichera trijuga, Odina wodiar, flame of the forest (Butea monosperma), golden shower tree (Cassia fistula), satinwood (Chloroxylon swietenia), black cutch (Acacia catechu), Shorea talura (E), indigoberry (Randia uliginosa).

Fauna

Mammals
Bandipur National Park harbours the Asian elephant, gaur, Bengal tiger, sloth bear, four-horned antelope, golden jackal and dhole.

The commonly seen mammals along the public access roads in the park include chital, gray langur, Indian giant squirrel and Indian elephant. A list of medium to large-sized mammals in the park is given in the following census table published in 1997:

Birds

Blue Peafowl are among the most commonly seen birds in Bandipur along with gray junglefowl, crows and drongos. Bandipur is home to over 200 species of birds including crested honey buzzard, red-headed vulture, Indian vulture, plain flowerpecker, hoopoe, Indian roller, brown fish owl, crested serpent eagle, changeable hawk-eagle, osprey, as well as many bee-eater and kingfisher species are a common sight in winter.

Reptiles

Reptile species include spectacled cobra, Indian rock python, vipers, rat snake, mugger crocodiles, monitor lizards, Indian chameleon, Indian pond terrapin, agamids and flying lizards.

Arthropods
Butterflies include common rose, crimson rose, common jay, lime butterfly, Malabar raven, common Mormon, red Helen, blue Mormon, southern birdwing, common wanderer, mottled emigrant, common grass yellow, spotless grass yellow, one spot grass yellow, Nilgiri clouded yellow, common Jezebel, Psyche, common gull, caper white or pioneer, small orange tip or lesser orange tip,  white orange tip, large salmon Arab, common evening brown, great evening brown,  common palmfly, common bushbrown, glad eye bushbrowm, red disk bushbrown, red eye bushbrown, Lepcha bushbrown, common threering, common fourring, common fivering,  tawny coster, rustic, common leopard, Indian fritillary, common sailer, colour sergeant,  chestnutstreaked sailer, gray count, red baron or baronet, angled castor, common castor,  yellow pansy, lemon pansy, peacock pansy,  chocolate pansy, orange pansy, blue pansy,  gray pansy, blue admiral, glassy blue tiger, dark blue tiger, plain tiger, striped/common tiger, Danaid eggfly, great eggfly, common crow, brown king crow, common Pierrot, angled Pierrot, banded blue Pierrot, striped Pierrot, dark Pierrot, red Pierrot, lime blue, zebra blue, gram blue, common cerulean, tiny grass blue, dark grass blue, Indian cupid, large four-line blue, common silverline, plum Judy, plain scupid, pea blue, metallic cerulean, chestnut Bob, dark palm dart, brown awl.

Ant species include Anenictus sp1, Anoplolepis longipes, Camponotus parius, Crematogaster biroi, Crematogaster sp 1*, Crematogaster sp 2*, Diacamma rugosum, Lepisiota capensis, Leptogenys chinesis,  Leptogenys coonorensis, Leptogenys diminuta, Lophomyrmex quadripinosus, Meranoplus bicolor,  Monomorium indicum,  Myrmicaria striata, Myrmicaria brunnea,  Oligomyrmex wroughtonii,  Pachycondyla sp1*,  Paratrechina sp1*,  Pheidole sharpi,  Pheidole sp1*, Pheidole sp2*,  Pheidologeton diverus, Polyrhachis exercita,  Solenopsis geminate,  Tetraponera rufonigra,  Tetraponera sp1*

Dung beetles include Catharsius granulatus *,  Copris indicus *,  Oniticellus cinctus*,  Onitis singhalensis *, Onthophagus beesoni*,  Onthophagus ensifer *,  Onthophagus rana *,  Onthophagus sp.107* #,  Onthophagus tarandus*,  Picnopanaleus rotundus,  Caccobius diminutives, Caccobius ultor,  Copris furciceps,  Copris sp.1#,  Heliocopris dominus, Pseudonthophagus sp.2#,  Sisyphus neglectus,  Caccobius inermis,  Caccobius meridionalis.,  Caccobius torticornis,  Caccobius sp.1#,  Copris sodalist,  Onthophagus socialis,  Onthophagus sp.301#,  Onitis phelemon,  Onthophagus furcillifer,  Caccobius gallinus,  Onthophagus rufulgens,  Onthophagus sp.302#,  Copris repertus,  Pseudonthophagus sp.1#,  Copris davisoni,  Onitis falcatus, Onthophagus turbatus,  Copris imitans,  Onthophagus quadridentatus,  Caccobius vulcanus,  Liatongus affinis,  Oniticellus spinipes,  Sisyphus longipus,  Onthophagus dama.

Conflicts and threats

The National Highways NH-181 and NH-766 pass through Bandipur national park. This road has been a major concern as speeding vehicles have killed many wild animals in spite of frequent warnings to travelers from the forest department officials and restriction on movement of vehicles in some stretches between 6 P.M to 6 A.M. This has raised fears of extinction of habitat of wild animals exclusively found in this national park.

On October 9, 2018 the National Park lost one of its prized possession, a tusker named 'Rowdy Ranga' was hit by a bus in the night after which the government of Tamil Nadu and Karnataka agreed to ban night traffic in the forest. However, Kerala condemns the 'Night Ban' and has asked for the ban to be lifted to save a reroute that increases the distance by 45 km.

See also

 2019 Bandipur forest fires
 Arid Forest Research Institute
 Indian Council of Forestry Research and Education
 Mudumalai National Park
 Nagarhole National Park

References

Karnataka State Gazetteer, 1983

External links
Park brochure from Karnataka Forest Department

Tiger reserves of India
National parks in Karnataka
Kingdom of Mysore
Protected areas established in 1931
Important Bird Areas of India
1931 establishments in India
South Western Ghats moist deciduous forests
Elephant reserves of India
Tourist attractions in Chamarajanagar district